The Hartsville Railroad was a railroad that served eastern South Carolina in the late 19th century.

The Hartsville Railroad Company was chartered by the South Carolina General Assembly in 1884, with the goal of constructing a line starting from Hartsville, South Carolina.

The line was completed in 1889 and was acquired by the Cheraw and Darlington Railroad in 1895. The Cheraw and Darlington was acquired by the Atlantic Coast Line Railroad in 1898.

References

Defunct South Carolina railroads
Predecessors of the Atlantic Coast Line Railroad
Railway companies established in 1889
Railway companies disestablished in 1895
1889 establishments in South Carolina
1895 disestablishments in South Carolina
Hartsville, South Carolina
1895 mergers and acquisitions